= Loop Leeuwarden =

Annual road running and walking event in the Netherlands

LOOP Leeuwarden
- Status: Active
- Genre: Road running, Walking
- Date: May (Mother's Day)
- Frequency: Annual
- Locations: Leeuwarden, Friesland, Netherlands
- Inaugurated: 1985
- Participants: Over 9,000 (2024)
- Website: Official Website

LOOP Leeuwarden, previously also known as Leeuwarden Marathon, is an annual road running and walking event held in Leeuwarden, Friesland, the Netherlands founded in 1985. Organized by Stichting Gezonde Stad Leeuwarden, it includes multiple race distances. Until 2011 the event included a marathon. It is the largest running and walking event in Friesland.

The event typically starts and finishes at Oldehoofsterkerkhof, with routes passing through downtown Leeuwarden and surrounding areas.

== History ==
The inaugural LOOP Leeuwarden took place in 1985. Since then, it has grown into one of the region's most anticipated sporting events, attracting thousands of participants each year. The event is traditionally held on Mother's Day.

The 2024 edition saw a record breaking of 9,000 participants. In 2025 event was marred by a tragic incident where a participant collapsed before finishing and later died. Several other runners also fell ill, leading to the cancellation of the complete event early due to safety concerns and the strain on medical services.

== Organization ==
LOOP Leeuwarden is organized by Stichting Gezonde Stad Leeuwarden, a foundation dedicated to promoting vitality and fitness among the inhabitants of Friesland. The foundation collaborates with schools, community centers, associations, businesses, institutions, and local governments to encourage physical activity and healthy lifestyles.
